The 1971 Gael Linn Cup, the most important representative competition for elite level participants in the women's team field sport of camogie, was won by Leinster, who defeated Ulster in the final, played at Parnell Park.

Arrangements
Leinster defeated Connacht at Parnell Park, scoring 7–4 without reply. Ulster defeated Munster by a point in Carrickmacross, 4–3 to 3–5. Leinster pulled away in the second half of the final with three goals from Josie Kehoe and two from Orla Ni Siochain to win by 5–4 to 0–5.
 Agnes Hourigan wrote in the Irish Press: The game was won and lost in the ten minutes after the interval when Leinster scored three goals and two points and Ulster's only score was a point from a thirty.

Final stages

|}

References

External links
 Camogie Association

1971 in camogie
1971
Cam